Altaf Hossain Gulandaz (15 August 1947 – 17 February 2007) is a Bangladesh Awami League politician and the incumbent Member of Parliament from Mymensingh-10.

Career
Gulandaz was elected Upazila Chairman in 1989. He was elected to Parliament in 1991, 1996, and 2001 from Mymensingh-10 as a Bangladesh Awami League candidate. He boycotted the parliament during the 15th session of the Bangladesh Nationalist Party rule.

Death
Gulandaz died on 17 February 2007 in MP Hostel, Dhaka, Bangladesh.

References

Awami League politicians
2007 deaths
5th Jatiya Sangsad members
7th Jatiya Sangsad members
8th Jatiya Sangsad members
People from Mymensingh District
1947 births